This article details the awards and nominations awarded to Indian film composer trio Shankar–Ehsaan–Loy.

Awards

Honorary 
2004 – Teacher's Achievement Award
2011 – The Jack Daniel's Years of Excellence Award
 2011 – NDTV Indian of the Year

National 
2004 – Best Music Director – Kal Ho Naa Ho

Filmfare Awards 
2002 – R. D. Burman Award for New Music Talent – Dil Chahta Hai
2004 – Best Music Director – Kal Ho Naa Ho
2006 – Best Music Director – Bunty Aur Babli
2015 – Best Music Director – 2 States

Filmfare Awards (Marathi) 
2016 – Best Music Director (Marathi) – Katyar Kaljat Ghusli

International Indian Film Academy Awards (IIFA) 
2004 – Best Music Director – Kal Ho Naa Ho
2006 – Best Music Director – Bunty Aur Babli
2011 – Best Background Score – My Name is Khan
2015 – Best Music Director – 2 States

Bollywood Movie Awards 
2004 – Best Music Director – Kal Ho Naa Ho
2006 – Best Music Director – Bunty Aur Babli
2007 – Best Music Director – Kabhi Alvida Naa Kehna

Sangeet Awards 
2004 – Best Music Director – Kal Ho Naa Ho
2006 – Best Song – "Kal Ho Naa Ho" – Kal Ho Naa Ho

Screen-Videocon Awards / Star Screen Awards 
2002 – Best Music Director – Dil Chahta Hai
2006 – Best Music Director – Bunty Aur Babli
2010 – Best Music Director – My Name Is Khan
2014 – Best Background Score – Bhaag Milkha Bhaag

Apsara Film & Television Producers Guild Awards 
2004 – Best Music Director – Kal Ho Naa Ho
2005 – Best Music Director – Bunty Aur Babli

Zee Cine Awards 
2006 – Best Music Director – Bunty Aur Babli

Global Indian Music Awards 
2010 – Best Background Score – My Name Is Khan
2014 – Best Background Score – Bhaag Milkha Bhaag

Mirchi Music Awards 
 2010 – Best Programmer and Arranger – My Name Is Khan
 2010 – Best song in Sufi Tradition – "Sajda" – My Name Is Khan
 2014 – Album of The Year – 2 States
 2014 – Music Composer of The Year – "Mast Magan" from 2 States
 2016 – Best Song Producer (Programming & Arranging) – "Kaaga" from Mirzya

Mirchi Music Awards (Telugu) 
2009 – Mirchi Music Awards (Telugu) Critics Awards (Album) – Konchem Ishtam Konchem Kashtam
2009 – Mirchi Music Awards (Telugu) Critics Awards (Song) – "Anandama" – Konchem Ishtam Konchem Kashtam

International

MTV Immies 
2003 – Best Album (Film Category) – Kal Ho Naa Ho 
2005 – Best Album (Film Category) – Bunty Aur Babli

Nominations

Filmfare Awards 
2002 – Best Music Director – Dil Chahta Hai
2007 – Best Music Director – Kabhi Alvida Naa Kehna
2009 – Best Music Director – Rock On!!
2010 – Best Music Director – Wake Up Sid
2011 – Best Music Director – My Name Is Khan
2012 – Best Music Director – Zindagi Na Milegi Dobara
2016 – Best Music Director – Dil Dhadakne Do

Filmfare Awards South 
2009 – Best Music Director (Telugu) – Konchem Ishtam Konchem Kashtam

International Indian Film Academy Awards 
2001 – Best Music Director – Mission Kashmir
2002 – Best Music Director – Dil Chahta Hai
2002 – Best Music Director – Kabhi Alvida Naa Kehna
2009 – Best Music Director – Rock On!!
2009 – Music Director of the Decade – Kal Ho Naa Ho, Bunty Aur Babli
2011 – Best Music Director – Karthik Calling Karthik, Housefull

Screen-Videocon Awards / Star Screen Awards 
2001 – Best Background Score – Mission Kashmir
2002 – Best Background Score – Dil Chahta Hai
2004 – Best Background Score – Kal Ho Naa Ho
2007 – Best Music Director – Kabhi Alvida Naa Kehna
2008 – Best Music Director – Taare Zameen Par
2008 – Best Background Score – Taare Zameen Par
2009 – Best Music Director – Rock On!!
2009 – Best Background Score – Rock On!!

Zee Cine Awards 
2010 –  Best Music Director – Karthik Calling Karthik, Housefull
2006 –  Best Music Director – Kabhi Alvida Naa Kehna
2005 –  Best Music Director – Bunty Aur Babli
2004 –  Best Music Director – Kal Ho Naa Ho
2002 –  Best Music Director – Dil Chahta Hai

Mirchi Music Awards 
 2010 – Music Director of the Year – My Name Is Khan
 2010 – Best Background Song of the Year – My Name Is Khan
 2010 – Album of the Year – My Name Is Khan
 2011 – Album of The Year – Zindagi Na Milegi Dobara
 2011 – Music Composer of The Year – "Senorita" from Zindagi Na Milegi Dobara
 2015 – Album of The Year – Dil Dhadakne Do
 2015 – Best Background Score – Dil Dhadakne Do
 2016 – Best Song Producer (Programming & Arranging) – "Mirzya" from Mirzya

V. Shantaram Awards 
2008 Best Music Director – Taare Zameen Par, Rock On!!

Apsara Film & Television Producers Guild Awards 
2008 Best Music Director – Taare Zameen Par, Rock On!!
2010 Best Music Director – My Name Is Khan Longlisted 
This section refers to awards where SEL has been considered for a nomination but has not been nominated.
 Academy Awards
 2012 – Best Original Song – "Delhi Safari" – Delhi Safari

 References 

 External links 
 Awards and Nominations received by Shankar–Ehsaan–Loy at The Internet Movie Database''.

Awards
Shankar-Ehsaan-Loy